Stackhousia huegelii is a species of plant in the family Celastraceae.

The species is found from the Mid West and along the coast to the Great Southern region of Western Australia.

References

huegelii
Plants described in 1837